The results of the Sweet Adelines International competition for choruses in the years 2010–2019 are as follows.

For the equivalent scores in the quartet competition see Sweet Adelines International quartet competitions, 2010–2019 and for a full explanation of the scoring system, qualification process, awards and records, see Sweet Adelines International competition.

Note that the grand total listed in the "final" column is the cumulative total of scores achieved in the semi-final and final rounds of competition. In addition to the direct-qualifying places, wildcard places are awarded to the 10 highest-scoring second-place choruses (or the top five before 2015) across all regional competitions, indicated herein as "[wild]". The winner of the Harmony Achievement award is indicated with "[harmony achievement]" next to the chorus' name.

2010

2011

2012

2013

2014

2015
The 2015 competition was held on 7 and 9 October at the MGM Grand Las Vegas and introduces a new ruleset that increased the scoring value on the performance "package" in the final round, and removed judge's bonus points, reducing the total possible score to 3200.  Scottsdale chorus won their fifth international championship medal, further extending their lead as the chorus with the most top-three placements in SAI competitions. This was the first time that Harbor City Music Company or Endeavour Harmony Chorus had qualified for the finals, with the latter also being the first Australian (region 34) chorus to do so.

2016
The 2016 competition was held on 17–22 October at the MGM Grand Las Vegas, the first time the competition was held at the same location twice in a row. Rönninge Show Chorus from Stockholm, Sweden won their second ever championship with a score of 3098. This was lower than their record-breaking score of 2013 but due to changes in the scoring system introduced in 2015, the maximum available points were reduced leading to Rönninge's 2016 result having a higher percentage, 96.8%, a new record. This was the first time that The Woodlands Chorus reached the finals.

2017
The 2017 competition was held on 12 and 14 October. For the third year running, it was held at the MGM Grand Las Vegas.

Wellington City qualified and were to compete in position number 2 but withdrew from the competition before it began. Therefore, Grand Rapids competed 2nd but are officially listed as contestant number 3.

2018
The 2018 competition semifinal was held on October 18, and the final on October 20, at The Dome at America's Center in St. Louis, Missouri. Scottsdale from region 21 won their first consecutive championship, placing them as outright second most successful chorus ever ahead of Rich-Tone who came third. Second was Harborlites, the wildcard from region 21, who had been leading after the semifinal. Metro Nashville won the "Harmony Achievement" award for the fourth consecutive time. It was the first time that Swedish competitor Pearls of the Sound had qualified for the finals, the only first-timer in the top ten.

2019
The 2019 competition will take place in September at the Smoothie King Center, New Orleans. The order of appearance of the qualified contestants, based on their 2018 regional competition scores, has been published.

References

External links

Data visualisation on Tableau Public of SAI Chorus Competition trends for the 2010s

Sweet Adelines International competitions